James Ian Kirkland (born August 24, 1954) is an American paleontologist and geologist. He has worked with dinosaur remains from the south west United States of America and Mexico  and has been responsible for discovering new and important genera. He named (or worked with others in naming) Animantarx, Cedarpelta, Eohadrosaurus (nomen nudum, now named Eolambia), Jeyawati, Gastonia, Mymoorapelta, Nedcolbertia, Utahraptor, Zuniceratops, Europelta and Diabloceratops. At the same site where he found Gastonia and Utahraptor, Kirkland has also excavated fossils of the therizinosaur Falcarius.

Career

Born August 24, 1954, Weymouth, Massachusetts.
High School, Marshfield High School, Marshfield, Massachusetts. 1972
B.S. Geological Sciences, New Mexico Institute of Mining and Technology, Socorro, New Mexico. 1977 (Pres. Student Body, 1975-1976)
M.S. Geology, Northern Arizona University, Flagstaff, Arizona. 1983
Ph. D. University of Colorado, Boulder, Colorado. 1990

He is adjunct Professor of Geology at Mesa State College, Grand Junction, Colorado, USA adjunct Associate Professor at University of Utah, Salt Lake City, Utah and a Research Associate of the Denver Museum of Natural History in the Denver Museum of Nature and Science, Colorado Boulevard, Denver, Colorado. 
For the past two decades he has been the Utah State Paleontologist for Utah Geological Survey. He issues permits for paleontological research on Utah state lands, keeps tabs on paleontological research and issues across the state, and promotes Utah’s paleontological resources for the public good.

Mesozoic
An expert on the Mesozoic, he has spent more than thirty years excavating fossils across the southwestern US and Mexico authoring and coauthoring more than 75 professional papers. The reconstruction of ancient marine and terrestrial environments, biostratigraphy, paleoecology, and mass extinctions are some of his interests. In addition to dinosaurs, he has described and named many fossil mollusks and fish.

Cretaceous
His researches in the middle Cretaceous of Utah indicate that the origins of Alaska and the first great Asian-North American faunal interchange occurred about 100 million years ago, which his numerous trips to China and Mongolia have substantiated.

Star Trek
Together with Diane Carey, he has written a Star Trek novel, First Frontier.

References
Notes

Bibliography

 Carpenter, K. with Kirkland, J.I., Burge, D.L., & Bird, J. (1999). "Ankylosaurs (Dinosauria: Ornithischia) of the Cedar Mountain Formation, Utah, and their stratigraphic distribution". In Gillette, D. (Ed.) Vertebrate Paleontology in Utah, Utah Geological Survey Miscellaneous Publication 99-1.
 Carpenter, K. with Kirkland, J.I., Burge, D.L., & Bird, J. (2001). "Disarticulated skull of a new primitive ankylosaurid from the Lower Cretaceous of Utah". In Carpenter, K. The Armored Dinosaurs. Indiana University Press, 2001.
 Kirkland, J.I. (1998). "A new hadrosaurid from the upper Cedar Mountain Formation (Albian-Cenomanian: Cretaceous) of eastern Utah - the oldest known hadrosaurid (lambeosaurine?)" New Mexico Museum of Natural History and Science Bulletin, Volume 14
 Kirkland, J.I. with Britt, B.B., Whittle, C.H., Madsen, S.K. & Burge, D.L. (1998). "A small coelurosaurian theropod from the Yellow Cat Member of the Cedar Mountain Formation (Lower Cretaceous, Barremian) of eastern Utah". New Mexico Museum of Natural History and Science, Bulletin 14.
 
 Kirkland, J.I. and Carpenter, K. (1994). "North America's first pre-Cretaceous ankylosaur (Dinosauria) from the Upper Jurassic Morrison Formation of western Colorado" Brigham Young University Geology Studies, volume 40
 Kirkland, J.I. and DeBlieux, D.D. (2010). "New basal centrosaurine ceratopsian skulls from the Wahweap Formation (Middle Campanian), Grand Staircase–Escalante National Monument, southern Utah", In: Ryan, M.J., Chinnery-Allgeier, B.J., and Eberth, D.A. (eds.) New Perspectives on Horned Dinosaurs: The Royal Tyrrell Museum Ceratopsian Symposium. Bloomington, Indiana University Press
 
 
 Wolfe, D.G. and Kirkland, J.I. (1998.) "Zuniceratops christopheri, n. gen. & n. sp., a ceratopsian dinosaur from the Moreno Hill Formation (Cretaceous, Turonian) of west-central New Mexico". Lower and Middle Cretaceous Terrestrial Ecosystems. New Mexico Museum of Natural History and Science Bulletin, volume 24

External links 
 Enchanted Learning web site
 James Kirkland.

American paleontologists
Living people
1954 births